France-Finland relations are foreign relations between France and Finland. France was one of the first countries which recognised Finland's independence on 4 January 1918. Diplomatic relations between them were established on 24 January 1918.
Both countries are full members of the European Union.
According to a 2005 BBC World Service Poll, 48% of Finns view French influence positively, with 26% expressing a negative view. There are an estimated 7,000 Finns living in France. 
Both countries are members of the European Union. France is a founding member of NATO, and Finland is a candidate country for NATO. 
France strongly supports Finland's NATO membership.

History

In August of 2022, France have fully ratified Finland's NATO membership application.

Resident diplomatic missions
 Finland has an embassy in Paris.
 France has an embassy in Helsinki.

See also 
 Foreign relations of France
 Foreign relations of Finland
 Finland–NATO relations

References

External links 
 Ministry for Foreign Affairs of France about relations with Finland 
 Ministry for Foreign Affairs of Finland about relations with France
History of the relations of Finland and France on Finnish Embassy in Paris websites
French Embassy in Helsinki
Finnish Embassy in Paris

 

 
Bilateral relations of France
France